St. Matthew's Church, currently known as the Holy Spirit Parish, is an historic Roman Catholic church at 1030 Dexter Street in Central Falls, Rhode Island located within the Diocese of Providence.

Description
The stone church was designed by Walter F. Fontaine and completed in 1929.  Its design was based on French Gothic styling.  It is built of Weymouth granite, with limestone trim.  The interior is richly decorated, and features artwork by Guido Nincheri and stained glass windows by Mommejean de Paris.  The church was built to serve the growing French-Canadian population of Central Falls.

The church was listed on the National Register of Historic Places in 1979.

See also
 Catholic Church in the United States
 Catholic parish church
 Index of Catholic Church articles
 National Register of Historic Places listings in Providence County, Rhode Island
 Pastoral care

References

External links 
Official site of the Holy See

Roman Catholic churches completed in 1929
20th-century Roman Catholic church buildings in the United States
Churches in the Roman Catholic Diocese of Providence
Churches on the National Register of Historic Places in Rhode Island
Buildings and structures in Central Falls, Rhode Island
Churches in Providence County, Rhode Island
Roman Catholic churches in Rhode Island
National Register of Historic Places in Providence County, Rhode Island
1929 establishments in Rhode Island